Jason McClelland (born 5 March 1997) is an Irish professional footballer who plays for League of Ireland Premier Division club, St Patrick's Athletic, having previously played for UCD for 5 seasons.

Club career

Early career
McClelland started off playing football with Shamrock Rovers at an early age. He moved on to Templeogue United and also enjoyed spells at Peamount United & Crumlin United before returning to Shamrock Rovers where he played with their Under 19's side in the 2014–15 season. He made his first senior appearance on 28 April 2015 when he came off the bench for the final 5 minutes of a 3–1 win away to Athlone Town in the Leinster Senior Cup. That proved to be his only senior appearance for Rovers as he moved on to UCD in July 2015, playing for their Under 19's side.

UCD
McClelland made his first senior appearance for UCD on 19 July 2015 in a friendly against Liverpool at the UCD Bowl. With the UCD first team fatigued following their UEFA Europa League campaign, it allowed McClelland a chance to make his first career senior appearance in a league game on 31 July 2015 when he came off the bench in a 3–0 win away to Cabinteely. He was an unused substitute in 7 other first team games that season as he continued to play with the under 19's. The 2016 season was McClelland's first season as a full first team player. His first career goal came on 3 June 2016 when he scored a 64th-minute goal in a 2–0 win at home to Shelbourne. He would again be the enemy of Shelbourne the following month when he scored an 84th-minute winner in a 2–1 win for UCD at Tolka Park. His final goal of the season came on 30 September 2016 when he scored in an 8–1 demolition of Waterford at the RSC. He finished the season with 20 appearances and 3 goals. The 2017 season saw UCD finish in third place in the league, with McClelland appearing 28 times in all competitions, scoring 7 goals. He was part of the side that won the Collingwood Cup, beating QUB in the final in February 2018. On 7 May 2018, he scored his first career hat-trick as his side thumped Wexford 8–0 at Ferrycarrig Park. On 28 September 2018, he played the full 90 minutes away to League of Ireland Premier Division Champions Dundalk in the FAI Cup Semi Finals as his side were denied a place in the Aviva Stadium by a narrow 1–0 scoreline. That was the club's final game of the season in a year which saw McClelland score 10 goals in 32 appearances in all competitions and also receive the first silverware of his career as his side gained promotion by winning the 2018 League of Ireland First Division. 2019 saw McClelland's first taste of League of Ireland Premier Division action. On 5 July he scored the winner in a crucial 1–0 victory over relegation fighting rivals Finn Harps. The season proved to be a difficult one for UCD as they finished bottom of the league and were relegated back to the First Division. The season did however provide a lot of experience at top tier level for McClelland, as he made 42 appearances in all competitions, scoring 4 goals.

St Patrick's Athletic
On 8 November 2019 it was announced that McClelland had signed for St Patrick's Athletic, becoming manager Stephen O'Donnell's first ever signing for the club. Upon signing, he spoke of his excitement at signing his first professional contract and his ambitions for the season ahead being to help the club get back to UEFA Europa League qualification. He made his competitive debut on 14 February 2020, making the starting eleven as his side lost 1–0 against Waterford in the opening game of the season at Richmond Park. He played in 16 of the club's 19 league and cup games over the course of the shortened season due to the Coronavirus pandemic, as his side missed out on European football on the final day of the season, finishing in 6th place. McClelland's first goal for the club came on 2 July 2021, scoring from 25 yards in a 3–2 loss to Bohemians at Dalymount Park with his side down to 9 men at the time. His first home goal at Richmond Park for the club came in a 6–0 win over Bray Wanderers in the FAI Cup on 23 July 2021, scoring a diving header to give his side a 2 goal lead going into half-time. On 1 November 2021, McClelland scored his first home league goal for the club when he finished a Jak Hickman cross from 5 yards to double his side's lead in the Dublin City derby against Bohemians on 1 November 2021. On 28 November 2021 McClelland scored his penalty in the 2021 FAI Cup Final penalty shootout, as his side defeated rivals Bohemians 4–3 on penalties following a 1–1 draw after extra time in front of a record FAI Cup Final crowd of 37,126 at the Aviva Stadium. On 18 December 2021, McClelland signed a new contract with the club for the 2022 season. On 11 February 2022, he made came off the bench in the 2022 President of Ireland's Cup against Shamrock Rovers at Tallaght Stadium, as his side lost 5–4 on penalties after a 1–1 draw. On 18 February 2022, he scored his side's third goal in a 3–0 win away to Shelbourne in the first league game of the season.

International career
McClelland received his first cap at international level on 15 November 2015 in a friendly for Republic of Ireland U19 against Latvia U19. His first competitive appearance came 3 days later when he played against Scotland U19 in a UEFA European Under-19 Championship qualifier.

Career statistics

Honours
UCD
League of Ireland First Division (1): 2018
Collingwood Cup (1): 2018

St Patrick's Athletic
FAI Cup (1): 2021

References

External links
 
 
 
 

1997 births
Living people
Association footballers from Dublin (city)
Crumlin United F.C. players
Peamount United F.C. (men) players
Shamrock Rovers F.C. players
University College Dublin A.F.C. players
St Patrick's Athletic F.C. players
League of Ireland players
Association football midfielders
Republic of Ireland association footballers
Association footballers from County Dublin
Republic of Ireland youth international footballers